Mount Stephens is a prominent mountain in Antarctica, 2,065 m, surmounting the west extremity of Saratoga Table in the Forrestal Range, Pensacola Mountains. It was mapped by the United States Geological Survey (USGS) from surveys and U.S. Navy air photos from 1956 to 1966. It was named by the Advisory Committee on Antarctic Names (US-ACAN) for Lieutenant Commander H.E. Stephens of the U.S. Navy, who was a leader of the unit from Mobile Construction Battalion One which constructed Ellsworth Station in January and February 1957.

Mountains of Queen Elizabeth Land
Pensacola Mountains